Christian Little (born July 5, 2003) is an American college baseball pitcher for the LSU Tigers. He previously played for the Vanderbilt Commodores.

Amateur career
Little was born and grew up in St. Louis, Missouri and attended Christian Brothers College High School. He committed to play college baseball at Vanderbilt when he was 14 years old. As a junior, Little was named the Missouri Gatorade Player of the Year after posting a 6-1 record with a 1.88 ERA and 58 strikeouts. Little completed his high school coursework over the following summer in order to enroll at Vanderbilt early.

Little made 11 starts during his freshman season and went 3-2 with a 5.48 ERA and 49 strikeouts. At 17 years old, he became the youngest pitcher to start a Southeastern Conference (SEC) game. Little later became the youngest player to start a College World Series game. As a sophomore, Little pitched mostly in relief and had a 3.72 ERA and 46 strikeouts in  innings pitched over 18 appearances. He entered the NCAA transfer portal after the end of the season.

Little ultimately committed to transfer to Louisiana State. During the summer prior to his junior season, he played collegiate summer baseball with the Cotuit Kettleers of the Cape Cod Baseball League.

References

External links

Vanderbilt Commodores bio

Living people
Baseball players from St. Louis
Baseball pitchers
Vanderbilt Commodores baseball players
Cotuit Kettleers players
2003 births